The Swedish Parasport Federation and Swedish Paralympic Committee, is the umbrella organization for parasport in Sweden. It was formerly known as the Swedish Sports Organization for the Disabled and Swedish Paralympic Committee ( or SHIF/SPK) and earlier the Swedish Sports Organization for the Disabled ( or SHIF). The current name was adopted during a meeting in Malmö on 9 May 2015.

It is the National Paralympic Committee in Sweden for the Paralympic Games movement. It's a non-profit organisation that selects teams, and raises funds to send Swedish competitors to Paralympic events organised by the International Paralympic Committee (IPC).

The organisation was founded in 1969, and became a member of the Swedish Sports Confederation the same year.

See also
 Sweden at the Paralympics
 Swedish Olympic Committee

References

External links
 

Parasports
Sports organizations established in 1969
National Paralympic Committees
1969 establishments in Sweden
Disability organizations based in Sweden
Federation